There are 63 Sites of Special Scientific Interest (SSSIs) in Cheshire, England, covering a total area of 19,844 hectares (49,035 acres). Of these, 51 have been designated for their biological interest, 7 for their geological or geomorphological features, and 5 for both.

SSSIs are governed by the Wildlife and Countryside Act 1981, which mandates that sites be selected for their "flora, fauna, or geological or physiographical features". The body responsible for designating biological SSSIs in England is Natural England, which took over the role of designating and managing SSSIs from English Nature on its creation in 2006. Earth sciences SSSIs are notified separately by the Joint Nature Conservation Committee across the entire UK via Geological Conservation Review. Natural England, like its predecessor bodies, uses a system of areas termed "Areas of Search", which broadly correspond with the 1974–1996 counties, and for consistency the same approach is followed here. In the case of Cheshire, the Area of Search differs from the modern ceremonial county boundary. Since the 1990s, nature conservation in England has also focused on 120 natural areas: regions defined by natural features rather than by administrative boundaries. The Cheshire Area of Search encompasses four natural areas.

The majority of the SSSIs fall within the Meres and Mosses natural area, which covers the bulk of the county, extending into Shropshire and Staffordshire to the south. This region is dominated by the Cheshire Plain, a wide expanse of flat or gently undulating farmland which rarely rises above 100 metres in elevation. Despite intensive agricultural use, diverse wetland habitats survive including mosses (bogs), swamps, fens, meres and thousands of ponds. Flashes, originating in subsidence after salt extraction, contain examples of inland salt marsh, an extremely rare habitat internationally. Ancient woodland is sparse throughout this area, but is found on the slopes of the Mid Cheshire Ridge and in river valleys towards the north of the county. The lowland heath habitat is very rare, occurring only at a handful of sites. The Mid Cheshire Ridge rises abruptly in the middle of the plain, with a high point of 227 metres; its Triassic sandstones are exposed at the Raw Head geological site.

Two extensive sites, Goyt Valley and Leek Moors, lie at the eastern edge of the county and the south-western end of the Pennines, within the South West Peak natural area of the Peak District. At a significantly higher elevation than the other Cheshire SSSIs and underlain by millstone grit and shale, they contain a variety of upland habitats, predominantly heather moorland, grassland and blanket mire.

Ten SSSIs are located in Warrington and the former boroughs of Halton and Ellesmere Port & Neston, in the north-west of the county. These fall within the Urban Mersey Basin natural area, which also covers Greater Manchester and Merseyside. Although the area as a whole is one of the most densely populated regions in Europe, much of the area within Cheshire is farmland. Semi-natural habitats here include ancient woodland, raised bog and freshwater wetland. The Rixton Clay Pits site represents former industrial land, and railway cuttings expose geological features. Finally, the Liverpool Bay coastal region contains two estuaries, the Mersey and Dee, which are Cheshire's largest SSSIs.

Sites

Notes 
All tabulated data are sourced from the Natural England website, and were last updated on 1 March 2010.

Data rounded to one decimal place. Area in acres converted from hectare value.

Grid reference is based on the British national grid reference system, also known as OSGB36, and is the system used by the Ordnance Survey.

Link to maps using the Nature on the Map service provided by Natural England.

Natural England citation sheets for each SSSI.

The River Dane and Holly Banks SSSIs overlap.

References

 
Cheshire
Sites of Special